Chris Brauchle (born May 24, 1967) is an American retired professional soccer player and current youth soccer coach.

Brauchle grew up in Montville, New Jersey and graduated from Montville Township High School in the class of 1985.

Playing career 
In 1989, Brauchle scored the game-winning goal against Vermont Catamounts to send Rutgers Scarlet Knights to the NCAA final four for the first time since 1967. The goal was scored in the eighteenth minute of stoppage time when Brauchle met a cross from Dave Muller and pushed it past Jim St. Andre.

Following his college career Brauchle joined Bayern Munich Amateure in the German Oberliga and remained at the club for two seasons. He then returned to the United States joining the Tampa Bay Rowdies in the American Professional Soccer League. In 1993, he returned to Germany signing with Jahn Regensburg and made 30 league appearances scoring 2 goals. In 1995, he returned to New Jersey signing with the Jersey Dragons. The following season, he joined the newly created Central Jersey Riptide in the USISL Pro League. He helped the club to a first-place finish in the Northeast division. He remained at the club for three seasons.

During the 1996 season Brauchle was loaned to MetroStars in Major League Soccer and made 5 league appearances with the top flight club. He made his debut for the club June 26, 1996 in a 2–0 victory over Kansas City Wizards. He ended his professional career in 1999 with USL club New Jersey Stallions.

Coaching career
Brauchle has coached youth soccer for the Parsippany Soccer Club since 2010. He was named Director of Coaching for the club in early 2014.

Statistics

References

External links 
 Profile on MetroFanatic
 
 USA Statistics

1967 births
Living people
American soccer players
Montville Township High School alumni
Soccer players from New Jersey
Association football midfielders
Rutgers Scarlet Knights men's soccer players
Tampa Bay Rowdies (1975–1993) players
New York Red Bulls players
Major League Soccer players
People from Montville, New Jersey
Sportspeople from Morris County, New Jersey